is a Japanese professional wrestler, signed to Pro Wrestling Noah. He started his career in Riki Choshu's Fighting World of Japan Pro Wrestling (WJ) promotion before heading to Kensuke Sasaki's Kensuke Office/Diamond Ring dojo and promotion. He has also wrestled for All Japan Pro Wrestling (AJPW), where he is a former World Junior Heavyweight Champion. An accomplished karateka, his style is based upon strong, fast kicks and strikes.

Nakajima made his professional debut aged 15 in a mixed martial arts contest and immediately made a name for himself in puroresu, earning the nickname "Supernova" and facing Hall of Famers such as Kenta Kobashi, Satoru Sayama, Jushin Thunder Liger, and Tatsumi Fujinami. He has competed in several notable Japanese promotions, including New Japan Pro-Wrestling (NJPW), Inoki Genome Federation, Pro Wrestling Zero1, Michinoku Pro, Dragon Gate, and currently, Pro Wrestling Noah.

He has set several age records throughout his career, including being the youngest wrestler to compete in AJPW's Champion Carnival tournament and the youngest to hold the World Junior Heavyweight Championship. He won the Tokyo Sports "Rookie of the Year" award in 2004 and the "Fighting Spirit" award in 2005. Having worked for Noah for most of his career, both as a representative of Diamond Ring and as a freelancer, he officially signed with the promotion in December 2015. He is a two-time GHC Heavyweight Champion, three-time GHC Junior Heavyweight Champion and a six-time GHC Tag Team Champion.

Professional wrestling career

2002–2004
An accomplished karateka, Nakajima was hired by Riki Choshu's World Japan promotion in December 2002 at the age of 14. He debuted for World Japan (WJ) in September 2003, facing American fighter Jason Leigh in an MMA fight, winning via knockout in one minute and thirty-five seconds. His true professional wrestling debut came on the main event of World Japan's "RESOLUTION" card on January 5, 2004, losing via submission to Tomohiro Ishii.

Nakajima continued to wrestle for WJ for a short time, even wrestling the original Tiger Mask Satoru Sayama before signing with Kensuke Office in April. This led to his debut with New Japan Pro-Wrestling, facing legendary junior heavyweight Jushin Thunder Liger in the Tokyo Dome on May 3, 2004. He made his debut with All Japan Pro Wrestling the next day, successfully teaming with Toshiaki Kawada in a six-man tag team match. He continued to wrestle for both promotions extensively throughout 2004, even competing in Block B of NJPW's Best of the Super Juniors tournament, finishing with two points by defeating Curry Man and reaching the finals of the Young Lion Toukon (fighting spirit) tournament, losing to Ryusuke Taguchi.

On June 12, 2004, in AJPW, Nakajima received the first championship match of his career, teaming with Kensuke Sasaki to unsuccessfully challenge Masanobu Fuchi & Genichiro Tenryu for the All Asia Tag Team Championship.  On September 17, 2004, Nakajima made his debut in Dragon Gate on their pay-per-view Gate of Sanctuary, losing to Masaaki Mochizuki. The following month, Nakajima entered the Osaka Pro Tenno-zan single-elimination tournament, losing to eventual winner Big Boss MA-G-MA in the first round. Nakajima and Sasaki teamed up in the World's Strongest Tag Determination League in November and December 2004, finishing with four points in Block B.

2005
Nakajima received his first opportunity at a singles championship on April 20, 2005, losing to World Junior Heavyweight Champion Taka Michinoku. His appearances in NJPW became much more sporadic around this time, with his final match to date taking place on April 24, 2005, a loss to 6-time IWGP Heavyweight Champion Tatsumi Fujinami.

On May 7, 2005, Katsuhiko participated in the 2005 Differ Cup, a biennial cross-promotional junior heavyweight tag team tournament, teaming with Osaka Pro's Takehiro Murahama; the two lost to Super Shisa and Tiger Emperor in the first round. He also teamed with Tomoaki Honma in a tournament throughout June 2005 to decide the vacant All Asia Tag Team Championship, making it to the finals before losing to Shuji Kondo & "brother" YASSHI. Just over one month later on July 26, 2005, Nakajima and Kensuke Sasaki defeated Kondo and YASSHI for the titles in their second defense, giving Nakajima his first championship. They would continue to defend the titles through 2005, against such teams as Arashi & Ryuji Hijikata and Buchanan & D'Lo Brown.

On July 18, 2005, Nakajima made his debut in Pro Wrestling Noah, wrestling in a six-man tag team match in the Tokyo Dome. He would continue by teaming with Kensuke Sasaki against Kenta Kobashi and his own protégé Go Shiozaki in an inter-generation tag team match on November 5, 2005, with Sasaki pinning Shiozaki after a lariat. This match was rated 4 out of 5 stars by wrestling journalist Dave Meltzer, one of only eight NOAH matches to receive that or a higher rating.

Nakajima made his debut for Pro Wrestling ZERO1-MAX on July 9, 2005, winning a six-man junior tag team match. He went on to defeat Osamu Namiguchi on August 31 for his first singles title, the WWA World Junior Light Heavyweight Championship, though whether this can be considered part of the title's official lineage is disputed. He held it until June 24, 2006, losing the title to premier ZERO1-MAX junior Tatsuhito Takaiwa. This is to date Nakajima's last appearance with the promotion.

2006
On February 11, 2006, at a Kensuke Office show celebrating Kensuke Sasaki's 20th career anniversary, Nakajima teamed with Genichiro Tenryu against the "dream team" of Kenta Kobashi and Kensuke Sasaki, falling to a Sasaki lariat. On March 21, 2006, Nakajima won a three-way elimination match in AJPW, defeating both Tomoaki Honma and NOSAWA Rongai to earn a spot in Block B of the prestigious 2006 Champion Carnival, becoming the youngest man to participate in the tournament. Nakajima finished in last place in the block with two points by defeating D'Lo Brown. On April 19, 2006, Nakajima entered Big Mouth Loud (BML), losing to company ace Katsuyori Shibata. The following month, Nakajima and Kensuke Sasaki battled in Big Japan Pro Wrestling (BJW), defeating Big Japan's Daisuke Sekimoto and Dramatic Dream Team's (DDT) Daichi Kakimoto in a tag team match when Nakajima pinned Kakimoto.

Nakajima then participated in the 2006 Junior League tournament from June 25, 2006, to July 3, 2006, to decide a challenger for the Junior Heavyweight Championship; Katsuhiko won his block with five points, before losing in the final to Kaz Hayashi. On July 2, 2006, Nakajima's partner Kensuke Sasaki suffered a left eye fracture in a match against Katsuyori Shibata in BML, taking him out of action for the foreseeable future and forcing the team to vacate the All Asia Tag Team Championship on October 29, 2006, after holding the titles since July 2005.

On October 15, 2006, Katsuhiko Nakajima and Kaz Hayashi were announced as one of seven teams in the 2006 World's Strongest Tag Determination League, to take place in December 2006. They had a strong showing in the tournament, defeating such teams as NOSAWA Rongai & Triple Crown Heavyweight Champion Minoru Suzuki and RO'Z & Suwama and drawing with Taiyō Kea & TAKA Michinoku, finishing with 5 points overall. On November 14, 2006, Nakajima wrestled in the main event of the debut show of the Global Professional Wrestling Alliance, a cooperation of several different promotions, teaming with NOAH's Go Shiozaki and El Dorado's Takuya Sugawara to defeat ZERO1-MAX's Ryouji Sai, Dramatic Dream Team's HARASHIMA and Kaientai Dojo's KAZMA.

2007

Kensuke Sasaki made his return from injury on January 2, 2007, teaming with Nakajima to defeat TARU & "brother" YASSHI. The following day Nakajima faced YASSHI in a match to determine Shuji Kondo's next challenger for the Junior Heavyweight Championship, winning via disqualification when Kondo himself interfered. He made his challenge on February 17, 2007, defeating Kondo to end his 16-month reign, and becoming the youngest junior heavyweight champion in history. Nakajima made his first defense of the title on April 30, 2007, defeating Kondo's Voodoo Murders partner "brother" YASSHI, as well as Ryuji Hijikata on May 27, 2007.

Nakajima once again participated in the Junior League in June 2007, finishing in third place for his block with four points, behind Hijikata and Kondo. The league was won by American wrestler Chris Sabin, setting up a title match between Sabin and Nakajima on August 26, 2007, in which Nakajima was victorious. On September 1, 2007, Nakajima challenged Pro Wrestling Noah's Takeshi Morishima for his ROH World Championship in the main event of a Kensuke Office show, putting up a good fight but losing in the end. On September 19, 2007, Nakajima was pinned in a tag team match by visiting luchador Silver King, who then challenged Nakajima to a future junior heavyweight title match. The match was made official for October 18, 2007, at All Japan's 35th anniversary show; on October 8, 2007, Nakajima suffered a fractured navicular bone in his right hand, forcing him off of several shows on the tour, though he defended the title as scheduled. When the match came, Nakajima and Silver King fought to a no contest, forcing PWF commissioner Hiroshi Hase to hold up the title belt, although Nakajima remained the official champion. Katsuhiko then took time off to nurse his injured hand.

2008
Nakajima returned from injury on February 11, 2008, at Kensuke Office's first anniversary show, defeating fellow Kensuke Sasaki protégé Ryuji Yamaguchi; he would follow this up with victories over two more Kensuke trainees in Kento Miyahara and Takashi Okita on February 16, 2008, and March 9, 2008, respectively, held in the Kensuke Office exercise hall. On March 1, 2008, in a rematch from their October encounter, Nakajima lost to Silver King in a match to decide the vacant junior heavyweight title. Later that month, Nakajima teamed with Ryuji Hijikata to participate in the six-team Junior Tag League, winning the tournament with six points by defeating the teams of Silver King and Shuji Kondo, MAZADA and NOSAWA Rongai, and T28 and KUSHIDA, as well as Kaz Hayashi and El Samurai in the final, who had defeated them in the group stage. On March 28, 2008, Nakajima faced and defeated Osaka Pro and Dragon Gate wrestler Magnitude Kishiwada on Kensuke Office's first event in the Fukuoka region.

In March and April 2008, Nakajima and Sasaki participated in Pro Wrestling Noah's Global Tag League, a 9-team round-robin tag team tournament. The two finished tied in 5th place with 8 points, defeating the teams of Jun Akiyama and Takeshi Rikio, D'Lo Brown and Buchanan, and Go Shiozaki and Akira Taue, and drawing with Takeshi Morishima and Muhammad Yone, and GHC Tag Team Champions Naomichi Marufuji and Takashi Sugiura. On May 25, 2008, in AJPW, Nakajima and Sasaki lost to Taiyō Kea and Minoru Suzuki in a match to determine the #1 contenders to the World Tag Team Championship. On June 13, 2008, at Kensuke Office's "Take the Dream Vol. 5", Nakajima faced NOAH's Kenta, losing the contest after 27 minutes. The following night in NOAH, Sasaki and Nakajima faced Kenta Kobashi and Kenta, wrestling to a 30-minute time limit draw. On June 29, 2008, Nakajima wrestled what would be his last match in AJPW for the time being, teaming with Kaz Hayashi to defeat Ryuji Hijikata and T28. Nakajima began to wrestle consistently with NOAH starting July 2, 2008, and it was announced the following week that he and the rest of Kensuke Office would be lending their support to NOAH instead of All Japan for the foreseeable future. Among Nakajima's first matches in NOAH were singles contests against former GHC Heavyweight Champions Jun Akiyama and Mitsuharu Misawa on July 5, 2008, and July 13, 2008, respectively, losing both matches.

In August and September 2008, Nakajima entered NOAH's annual NTV Cup junior heavyweight tag team league, teaming with DDT's Kota Ibushi in the 8-team tournament. The two finished in fifth place with eight points, including a victory over 2007 winners, as well as the eventual 2008 winners, Kenta and Taiji Ishimori. Nakajima and Ibushi would team once more on September 8, 2008, on a co-production between DDT and SEM, NOAH's offshoot promotion for younger wrestlers, against DDT's HARASHIMA and Antonio Honda. The match originally went to a 20-minute time limit draw, but was restarted and Nakajima pinned Honda shortly thereafter. On September 14, 2008, Nakajima participated in American promotion Ring of Honor's second tour of Japan, teaming with Naomichi Marufuji against Kenta and Kota Ibushi in a special tag match. The two teams went to a 30-minute time limit draw; the match was restarted, but ended once more in a draw after an additional five minutes expired. The following week on September 20, Nakajima wrestled his first match in the United States, challenging GHC Junior Heavyweight Champion Bryan Danielson at ROH's Glory by Honor VII. Danielson would retain his title, making Nakajima submit to the Cattle Mutilation.

2009

Nakajima went to win the GHC Junior Heavyweight Championship from Kenta using his Death Roll at the February 11th Kensuke Office event. A notable fact is that this was the second time Nakajima and Sasaki  held the Jr. Heavyweight and Heavyweight titles of the same promotion at the same time, the first being All Japan.

He would then lose the GHC Junior Heavyweight Championship back to Kenta via a Go 2 Sleep at the March 1st Pro Wrestling Noah event; coincidentally, Sasaki would lose the GHC Heavyweight Title later that night.

On Nov. 13 Nakajima made his return to Ring of Honor in Novi, Michigan, in a losing effort against Kenny Omega. The next night in Mississauga Ontario he was victorious against El Generico in a match that was hard hitting and fast paced. The fans in turn gave Nakajima the "please come back" chant.

2011–present
On September 23, 2011, Nakajima defeated Kotaro Suzuki to win the GHC Junior Heavyweight Championship for the second time. However, he was forced to vacate the title just nine days later, after undergoing surgery for acute appendicitis. Nakajima returned on November 27 and defeated Ricky Marvin in a decision match to regain the GHC Junior Heavyweight Championship. On May 9, 2012, Nakajima lost the GHC Junior Heavyweight Championship to Yoshinobu Kanemaru, ending his third reign at 164 days. Nakajima along with his mentor Kensuke Sasaki reached the Pro Wrestling Noah Global Tag League final in 2013, but lost to the team of KENTA and Yoshihiro Takayama. Nakajima then took part in a brief feud with Maybach Taniguchi which culminated at the NOAH "GREAT VOYAGE 2013 IN TOKYO" event. Also at the event Naomichi Marufuji recruited Nakajima into his faction "Brave". On February 11, 2014, Nakajima earned his first win over his mentor Kensuke Sasaki in the main event of a show celebrating his tenth anniversary in professional wrestling. The match turned out to be Sasaki's retirement match.

On July 31, 2015, Nakajima left Diamond Ring. On December 24, 2015, Noah held a press conference announcing that Nakajima would be ending his days as a freelancer and officially joining the promotion on January 1, 2016. On February 24, 2016, Nakajima picked up the biggest win of his career by defeating Minoru Suzuki in the main event of Noah's show in Korakuen Hall. As a result, Nakajima was granted a shot at the GHC Heavyweight Championship, but was defeated by Takashi Sugiura on March 19.

From July 22 to August 13, 2016, Nakajima took part in NJPW's 2016 G1 Climax, where he finished tied third in his block with a record of five wins and four losses, failing to advance to the finals. On October 23, Nakajima defeated Takashi Sugiura to win the GHC Heavyweight Championship for the first time. Nakajima made his first title defense in a match against the 2016 Global League winner, Minoru Suzuki, at One Night Cruise in Korakuen on December 2. Nakajima's second title defense was on December 24 as a part the Winter Navigation tour where he defended his title against his ally and occasional tag team partner, Masa Kitamiya. Following the match, Sugiura challenged Nakajima to a rematch for the title. This rematch would take place on January 7, 2017, which was the first show of Noah's first tour of 2017 "The First Navigation." Nakajima ultimately defeated Sugiura thus marking his third title defense. Nakajima defeated Go Shiozaki at "Great Voyage in Yokohama" on March 12, 2017, marking his fourth title defense. On June 4, 2017, at "Navigation with Breeze", Nakajima made his fifth title defense against Muhammad Yone. He followed it up with his sixth successful defense against Atsushi Kotoge on June 25, 2017. On July 20, he defeated Brian Cage to make his seventh successful defense. On August 26, Nakajima lost the title to Eddie Edwards in his eighth defense. On March 11, 2018, Nakajima and Kitamiya defeated 50 Funky Powers (Muhammad Yone and Quiet Storm) to win the GHC Tag Team Championship for the first time together, thus marking Nakajima's first reign with the title. However on April 29, they lost the titles to Go Shiozaki and Kaito Kiyomiya in their first defense. After the match, Nakajima and Kitamiya attacked Shiozaki and Kiyomiya, with Nakajima showing a new, more sadistic personality in the following months. They regained the titles one month later only to again lose them in their first defense on July 28 to Naomichi Marufuji and Akitoshi Saito. After Kitamiya unsuccessfully challenged Takashi Sugiura for the GHC Heavyweight Championship, he was challenged to a title match by the champion, which he accepted. Nakajima would also unsuccessfully challenge Sugiura for the title on October 4. Nakajima participated on the 2018 Global League, winning 4 matches and losing 2, failing to advance to the finals. However, after Naomichi Marufuji suffered an injury on his shoulder, a three way match to determine the new finalist between Kenoh, Kohei Sato and Katsuhiko Nakajima happened on November 25, which Nakajima won. On the finals, Nakajima would lose to Kaito Kiyomiya. Naomichi Marufuji and Akitoshi Saito vacated the GHC Tag Team Championship on November 28, a tournament to decide the new champions happened on December 7. Nakajima teamed with Go Shiozaki, and together they would defeat Cody Hall and Maybach Taniguchi at the first round, and Kenoh and Masa Kitamiya at the finals. They would lose the titles 9 days later to Maybach Taniguchi and a debuting Yuji Hino. They got their rematch on January 6, but failed again. However, after Muhammed Yone and Quiet Storm defeated Taniguchi and Hino, Nakajima and Shiozaki challenged the new champions. This led to a match on February 24, which Nakajima and Shiozaki won. Backstage, Nakajima said that his Tag Team with Go Shiozaki has a name, and it is AXIZ. AXIZ made their first successful defense on March 10, against the team of Eddie Edwards and Masa Kitamiya. From April 7 until April 30, AXIZ took part in the 2019 Global Tag League, finishing the tournament with a record of five wins, one loss, and one draw, advancing to the finals of the tournament. On May 4, AXIZ was defeated in the finals by Sugiura-gun (Takashi Sugiura and Kazma Sakamoto). On June 13, AXIZ lost the GHC Tag Team Championship to Sugiura-gun, before defeating them in rematch on June 27 to win the GHC Tag Team Championship for the record-breaking third time. Afterwards, AXIZ were challenged by Kaito Kiyomiya and Shuhei Taniguchi to match for their titles. Nakajima accepted Kiyomiya and Taniguchi's challenge for their titles on the condition that Kiyomiya would defend the GHC Heavyweight Championship against him. On July 21, AXIZ defeated Kiyomiya and Taniguchi to make their first successful of the GHC Tag Team Championship. Six days later, Nakajima unsuccessfully challenged Kaito Kiyomiya for the GHC Heavyweight Championship.

On January 5, 2020, at January New Sunrise and Reboot Koruaken Hall Show, AXIZ lost the GHC Tag Team Championship to Masaaki Mochizuki and Naomichi Marufuji. Afterwards, AXIZ began focusing on their singles careers, after Nakajima defeated Daiki Inaba to win the Wrestle-1 Championship on January 12 as part of a working relationship between Noah and Wrestle-1. Nakajima lost the title to Kaz Hayashi on March 15. The following month, AXIZ took part in the 2020 Global Tag League, making to their second consecutive Global Tag League final by winning their block in the 2020 tournament with a record of two wins and one loss. On April 18, they were defeated in the finals of the tournament by Sugiura-gun International (Hijo de Dr. Wagner Jr. and Rene Dupree). On May 9, Nakajima defeated Takashi Sugiura to win the GHC National Championship, meaning that AXIZ held both Noah's singles championships. On August 4, on the first night of Departure, Nakajima lost the GHC National Championship to Kenoh.

On August 20, AXIZ faced Sugiura-gun (Kazushi Sakuraba and Takashi Sugiura) in a losing effort for the vacant GHC Tag Team Championship. Afterwards, Nakajima turned on Shiozaki in order to join KONGOH, effectively disbanding AXIZ. From September 18 and October 11, Nakajima took part in the 2020 N-1 Victory, finishing the tournament with a record of four wins, and one loss to advance to the finals of the tournament. On October 11, Nakajima defeated Kaito Kiyomiya in the finals to win the 2020 N-1 Victory. This led on November 23 at NOAH The Chronicle Vol. 4, Nakajima unsuccessfully challenging Go Shiozaki for the GHC Heavyweight Championship. Following KONGOH's feud with Sugiura-gun, on January 31, Nakajima and Masa Kitamiya faced Sugiura-gun members Takashi Sugiura and Kendo Kashin in a winning effort. After the match, Nakajima and Kitamiya challenged Sugiura and his partner Kazushi Sakuraba to a title match for the GHC Tag Team Championship. Afterwards, in a post-match interview, Nakajima confirmed the reunion of The Aggression. On March 7, 2021, at Great Voyage in Yokohama, Nakajima and Kitamiya defeated Sugiura-gun's Kazushi Sakuraba and Takashi Sugiura to win the GHC Tag Team Championship for the third time. On May 31, following a GHC Tag Team Championship title defense, Kitamiya turned on Nakajima, leaving KONGOH due to his hatred towards Nakajima, effectively ending their partnership. This led to Noah announcing a steel cage Lucha de Apuestas, hair vs. hair match on June 26. At the event Cage War, Nakajima was forced to shave his hair after being defeated by his former partner Kitamiya and would instruct his KONGOH stablemate Kenoh to fully shave his head. Despite their breakup, Nakajima and Kitamiya were recognized as GHC Tag Team Champions, until on June 30, Nakajima and Kitamiya decided to face each other for the vacant titles, with Nakajima teaming with Soya and Kitamiya with Kaito Kiyomiya. On July 22, Nakajima and Soya were defeated by Kitamiya and Kaito Kiyomiya for the vacant GHC Tag Team Championship.

In September, Nakajima took part in the 2021 N-1 Victory, winning his block with a record of two wins and one loss, advancing to the semifinals of the tournament. On October 3, Nakajima defeated Masakatsu Funaki and then fellow KONGOH stablemate Kenoh, in the semifinals and finals, respectively, to win the N-1 Victory for the second year, earning a shot at the GHC Heavyweight Championship. On October 10, Nakajima defeated Naomichi Marufuji to win the GHC Heavyweight Championship for the second time. On November 13, Nakajima was challenged by stablemate Kenoh to a double title-match for the GHC Heavyweight and GHC National Championships on November 28 at Noah the Best. At the event, Nakajima faced Kenoh in a 60-minute time limit draw to retain the GHC Heavyweight Championship and unsuccessfully challenging Kenoh for the GHC National Championship. Afterwards, Go Shiozaki made his return from injury challenging his former AXIZ teammate Katsuhiko Nakajima to a title match for the GHC Heavyweight Championship on January 1, at Noah The New Year. On December 27, following a victory in a ten-man tag team match, where Nakajima pinned Shiozaki, he stated that if lost to him at NOAH The New Year, Shiozaki should never repeat his catchphrase "I am Noah" again. At a press conference the following day, Shiozaki agreed to Nakajima's condition of never using his catchphrase "I am Noah" again, on the condition that if he won, Nakajima would be forced to reunite AXIZ with him. At the event, Nakajima successfully defended the GHC Heavyweight Championship against Shiozaki, forcing him to abandon his "I am Noah" catchfrase. On January 16, Nakajima made his fourth successful title defense against Masa Kitamiya. On February 23, Nakajima lost the GHC Heavyweight Championship to Kazuyuki Fujita in his fifth title defense.

On June 12, 2022, at CyberFight Festival 2022, Nakajima teamed with Atsushi Kotoge and Yoshiki Inamura, facing off against Burning (Jun Akiyama and Tetsuya Endo) and Kazusada Higuchi in a six-man tag team match, where in the match, Nakajima delivered a slap to Endo that knocked Endo out, causing the match to be called off.

Championships and accomplishments
All Japan Pro Wrestling
All Asia Tag Team Championship (1 time) – with Kensuke Sasaki
World Junior Heavyweight Championship (1 time)
Junior Tag League (2008) – with Ryuji Hijikata
January 3 Korakuen Hall Junior Heavyweight Battle Royal (2005) 
Samurai! TV Cup Triple Arrow Tournament (2007) – with Kensuke Sasaki and Seiya Sanada
Michinoku Pro Wrestling
Tohoku Tag Team Championship (1 time) – with Kensuke Sasaki
New Japan Pro-Wrestling
Yuko Six Man Tag Team Tournament (2004) – with Blue Wolf and Shinsuke Nakamura
New Wave Award (2004)
Pro Wrestling Illustrated
Ranked No. 32 of the 500 best singles wrestlers in the PWI 500 in 2022
Pro Wrestling Noah
GHC Heavyweight Championship (2 time)
GHC National Championship (1 time)
GHC Junior Heavyweight Championship (3 times)
GHC Tag Team Championship (6 times) – with Masa Kitamiya (3) and Go Shiozaki (3)
Leave Cup Scramble Battle Royal (2013)
N-1 Victory (2020, 2021)
Global League Outstanding Performance Award (2014)
Global Tag League Outstanding Performance Award (2013) – with Kensuke Sasaki
Global Tag League Outstanding Performance Award (2014) – with Naomichi Marufuji
Pro Wrestling Zero1-Max
WWA World Junior Light Heavyweight Championship (1 time)
Tenryu Project
Tenryu Project International Junior Heavyweight Tag Team Championship (1 time) – with Satoshi Kajiwara
Tokyo Sports
Fighting Spirit Award (2005, 2016)
Rookie of the Year (2004)
Wrestle-1
Wrestle-1 Championship (1 time)

References

External links

 
 Profile at All-Japan.co.jp
 Official profile at Kensuke-Office.com
 Kensuke Office blog

1988 births
Japanese male professional wrestlers
Sportspeople from Fukuoka (city)
Living people
21st-century professional wrestlers
GHC Heavyweight Champions
GHC Junior Heavyweight Champions
GHC National Champions
GHC Tag Team Champions
All Asia Tag Team Champions
World Junior Heavyweight Champions (AJPW)
Tohoku Tag Team Champions
International Junior Heavyweight Tag Team Champions
Wrestle-1 Champions